The University of Corsica Pasquale Paoli (Corsican: Università di Corsica Pasquale Paoli) is a French university, based in Corte, Haute-Corse, with secondary campuses in Ajaccio, Biguglia and Cargèse. Founded in 1765, closed in 1769, and re-founded in 1981, it is the only university on the island of Corsica.

Notable people

Faculty
 Xavier Mattei (born 1939, in Tunisia) - zoologist

Alumni
 Michel Castellani (born 1945) - politician
 Gilles Simeoni (born 1967) - politician

See also
 List of public universities in France
 Pasquale Paoli

Educational institutions established in 1981
1981 establishments in France
Education in Corte, Haute-Corse
University of Corsica Pasquale Paoli